Statistics of Veikkausliiga in the 1998 season.

Overview
It was contested by 10 teams, and Haka Valkeakoski won the championship.

League standings

Results

Matches 1–18

Matches 19–27

See also
Suomen Cup 1998

References
Finland - List of final tables (RSSSF)

Veikkausliiga seasons
Fin
Fin
1